James Morrison (born June 26, 1942) is an American retired professional wrestler and manager, better known by his ring name, J. J. Dillon.

Professional wrestling career
J. J. Dillon had an extensive wrestling career. He broke into wrestling at the age of 29, starting out in the early 1970’s as a referee transitioning into a wrestler and then a manager winning many championships and managing a variety of wrestlers throughout many different territories around the country. He made his Madison Square Garden debut on April 23, 1984 when he challenged Tito Santana for the WWF Intercontinental Heavyweight Championship, losing by pinfall after a flying forearm by Santana.

He is most remembered in pro wrestling as a manager. He guided many wrestlers to singles and tag team titles in the NWA. Dillon, who became manager of Tully Blanchard, achieved his greatest success as the manager of the Four Horsemen which consisted of "Nature Boy" Ric Flair, Blanchard, Arn Anderson , Ole Anderson, Lex Luger and Barry Windham. After leaving WCW in February 1989, Dillon served as a front office executive for the WWF until 1997. On April 21, 1997, he returned to WCW as an on-camera commissioner, a position which lasted until fall 1998. He would return to this role in 1999 before his final departure. In 2003, Dillon had a short stint as an NWA representative in TNA.

In 2009, he made a one-night appearance at Deaf Wrestlefest 2009 to team with "Beef Stew" Lou Marconi and "Handsome" Frank Staletto in a six-man tag team match against "Franchise" Shane Douglas, Dominic Denucci and Cody Michaels.

On December 29, 2019, Dillon joined the Board of Directors of the International Pro Wrestling Hall of Fame. On March 3, 2021, Dillon returned to TNT to act as manager for Tully Blanchard on an episode of AEW Dynamite. In 2022, Dillon makes an appearance on Judge Steve Harvey with wrestler Kevin Sullivan.

Championships and accomplishments
Cauliflower Alley Club
Other inductee (2007)
Central States Wrestling
NWA Central States Tag Team Championship (1 time) – with Buzz Tyler
Championship Wrestling from Florida
NWA Florida Heavyweight Championship (1 time)
NWA Florida Tag Team Championship (1 time) - with Roger Kirby
NWA Florida Television Championship (1 time)
Eastern Sports Association
ESA International Heavyweight Championship (1 time)
ESA International Tag Team Championship (1 time) - with Freddie Sweetan
ESA North American Heavyweight Championship (1 time)
George Tragos/Lou Thesz Professional Wrestling Hall of Fame
Lou Thesz Award (2016)
National Wrestling Alliance
 NWA Hall of Fame (class of 2014)NWA Western States SportsNWA International Heavyweight Championship (Amarillo version) (1 time)
NWA Western States Television Championship (1 time)Georgia Championship WrestlingNWA Macon Heavyweight Championship (1 time)Professional Wrestling Hall of FameClass of 2013Pro Wrestling Illustrated''PWI Manager of the Year (1982, 1983, 1988)WWE'''
WWE Hall of Fame (Class of 2012) as a member of The Four Horsemen

Books

References

External links 

 
 
 JJ Dillon Interview
 Pick My Brain with JJ Dillon

1942 births
American male professional wrestlers
American podcasters
The Four Horsemen (professional wrestling) members
Living people
Sportspeople from Trenton, New Jersey
Professional Wrestling Hall of Fame and Museum
Professional wrestlers from New Jersey
Professional wrestling managers and valets
Professional wrestling trainers
WWE executives
WWE Hall of Fame inductees
Stampede Wrestling alumni
20th-century professional wrestlers
NWA Florida Heavyweight Champions
NWA Florida Tag Team Champions
NWA Macon Heavyweight Champions